Star Trek: Starfleet Command is a computer game based on the table-top wargame Star Fleet Battles. It was developed by 14° East and Quicksilver Software and published by Interplay Entertainment. It was released in 1999 for Microsoft Windows. It simulates starship operations, ship-to-ship combat, and fleet warfare in the Star Trek universe. An expanded version was released in 2000 titled Star Trek: Starfleet Command - Gold Edition. It includes the latest patch and all the missions that were downloadable from the official website.

Gameplay

The player chooses to represent one of the Star Trek factions, including the Gorn, the Hydran Kingdom, the Klingon Empire, the Lyran Empire, the Orion Pirates, the Romulan Star Empire, and the United Federation of Planets. Play can be a simple skirmish, or single- or multi-player mode.

Gameplay consists of maneuvering one's ship to approach enemy ships and assault them in the areas where various systems and ship's shields are vulnerable. It also consists of achieving various other objectives specified in mission assignment, which are provided at the beginning of each scenario. Depending on the specific assignment, this can include interacting with various ships, aliens, planetary bodies, and other objects in space.

Plot
Though the game has no central story-mode campaign, players may play as a member of one of six stellar powers, each one having at least one elite organization that, when joined, will trigger special missions that tell various stories. Though having unique stories, each race's special missions all contribute expository information on the fate of a race known as the Organians and the effect that their departure from known space has since caused.

Reception

The game received "favorable" reviews according to the review aggregation website GameRankings. John Lee of NextGen called it "a complex real-time strategy game with a steep learning curve, but it's eminently rewarding."

According to Erik Bethke, sales of the game surpassed 350,000 copies after a year on shelves "without counting the Gold Edition and the Neutral Zone expansion." It was Interplay's best-selling game through direct sales, above Baldur's Gate.

The staff of Computer Games Strategy Plus nominated the game for their 1999 "Real-Time Strategy Game of the Year" award, which ultimately went to Age of Empires II: The Age of Kings. They wrote that the game "avoided the curse of the Star Trek game and produced a game of remarkable depth coupled with simple mechanics."

In 2016, Tom's Guide ranked the game as one of the top ten Star Trek games. A year later, PC Gamer ranked it among the best Star Trek games. Three years afterward, Screen Rant ranked it as the 4th best Star Trek game.

See also
 Star Trek: Starfleet Command: Orion Pirates
 Star Trek: Starfleet Command II: Empires at War
 Star Trek: Starfleet Command III

References

External links
 
 

1999 video games
Interplay Entertainment games
Multiplayer online games
Quicksilver Software games
Real-time tactics video games
Space MOGs
Star Fleet Universe
Starfleet Command
Video games based on board games
Starfleet Command
Windows games
Windows-only games
Video games developed in the United States
Multiplayer and single-player video games